Scala Coeli is a village and comune in the province of Cosenza in the Calabria region of southern Italy.
 
The village is bordered by Campana, Cariati, Crucoli, Mandatoriccio, Terravecchia and Umbriatico.

Cities and towns in Calabria